Andrey Belofastov (born 2 October 1969 in Kyiv, Ukraine) is a Russian former water polo player who competed in the 1992 Summer Olympics.

See also
 List of Olympic medalists in water polo (men)

References

External links
 

1969 births
Living people
Sportspeople from Kyiv
Soviet male water polo players
Ukrainian male water polo players
Russian male water polo players
Olympic water polo players of the Unified Team
Water polo players at the 1992 Summer Olympics
Olympic bronze medalists for the Unified Team
Olympic medalists in water polo
Medalists at the 1992 Summer Olympics